Robert Cooper was an English professional footballer who played as an inside forward. He played in the Football League for Middlesbrough Ironopolis and Grimsby Town.

References

English footballers
Association football forwards
Middlesbrough Ironopolis F.C. players
Grimsby Town F.C. players
English Football League players
Year of death missing
Year of birth missing